Myo Hlaing Win is an Myanmar international footballer who plays as a forward He was the top goalscorer at the 1998 Tiger Cup. He was a prolific goalscorer, and despite being more of an individualistic attacker, he was also capable of providing assists for his teammates, due to his vision, passing and crossing ability. He was an extremely powerful, fast, and technical player, as well as being a composed finisher.

International goals

Scores and results list Myanmar's goal tally first, score column indicates score after each Myanmar goal.

Individual
AFF Championship Golden Boot : 1998

References

1973 births
Living people
Myanmar international footballers
Burmese footballers
Association football forwards
Southeast Asian Games silver medalists for Myanmar
Southeast Asian Games medalists in football
Competitors at the 1993 Southeast Asian Games
Footballers at the 1994 Asian Games
Asian Games competitors for Myanmar